The management of waste in New Zealand has become more regulated to reduce associated environmental issues. According to OECD data, New Zealand is the third most wasteful country in the OECD.

History
Until recently, waste was taken to local rubbish dumps with little or no control as to where they were sited. Often the dumps were close to water ways. In recent years the location of dumps was consolidated and they are now constructed as sanitary landfills to prevent leaching of the contents into water bodies. Transfer stations, especially in cities, act as a local collection point where the waste is compacted before being transported to the nearest landfill.

In 2007 the OECD Environmental Performance Reviews for waste gave the following recommendations:

develop national regulations for managing hazardous waste
expand and upgrade waste treatment and disposal facilities
increase regulatory support for recovery or recycling
clarify liability arrangements for remediation of contaminated sites

Mass
1.6 million tonnes per year is generated from the construction and demolition industry which represents 50% of total waste to landfills.

Christchurch

Waste volumes from kerbside collections was almost 40,000 tonnes but reduced after the introduction of kerbside recycling and a halving in the number of free rubbish bags. In 2009 the Council introduced 140 litre wheelie bins for kerbside collection after which waste volumes began to rise.

Types

Agricultural plastics 
Agriculture is one of the largest sectors of the economy in New Zealand and consequently a large volume of waste is produced in relation to other industries. Collection of containers that contained agricultural chemicals is carried out in some regions. The burning of plastic waste was made illegal in recent years due to the release of toxic pollutants.

Construction waste

Electronic waste 

Electronic waste is an increasing part of the waste stream and the Ministry for the Environment are investigating ways of dealing with it. The annual eDay, which started from a trial in 2006, is used as means of collecting electronic waste for reuse or recycling.

Food waste 

The total volume of food wasted in New Zealand is not known. Research was conducted in 2014 into food waste, generated by households, that was disposed of through curbside rubbish collections. The study found that 229,022 tonnes of food is sent to landfill by households annually. Of this approximately 50% or 122,547 tonnes is avoidable food waste. The cost of avoidable household food waste disposed of to landfill in 2014/2105 was $872 million pa. A detailed report available on the WasteMINZ website provides more information into household food waste. No research has been undertaken to date into commercial or supply chain food waste.

Waste reduction

By 1996 the New Zealand cities of Auckland, Waitakere, North Shore and Lower Hutt had kerbside recycling bins available. In New Plymouth, Wanganui and Upper Hutt recyclable material was collected if placed in suitable bags. By 2007 73% of New Zealanders had access to kerbside recycling.

Kerbside collection of organic waste is carried out by the Mackenzie District Council and the Timaru District Council. Christchurch City Council has introduced an organic waste collection system as part of kerbside recycling. Other councils are carrying out trials.

Waste to energy incineration 
Recently, there has been a rise in interest for waste-to-energy incineration, where waste is turned into energy for communities to use. However, research has found that this method could create more environmental issues, with 1.2 tonnes of CO2 being produced for every waste tonne. Plastic pollution researcher Trisia Farrelly recommends that this is a wasteful technique which "destroys valuable resources and perpetuates waste generation".

Waste legislation
New Zealand is a signatory to the International Convention for the Prevention of Pollution From Ships, 1973 as modified by the Protocol of 1978, commonly known as MARPOL.

The Green Party tabled a Waste Minimisation Bill in 2006. It passed into law in 2008 as the Waste Minimisation Act. The major provisions of the Act are: a levy on landfill waste, promoting product stewardship schemes, some mandatory waste reporting, clarifies the role of territorial authorities with respect to waste minimisation, and sets up a Waste Advisory Board.

Waste (landfill)
The number of landfills in New Zealand is reducing. In 1995 there were 327 and 115 in 2002 with recent estimates placing the number at less than 100. Notable landfills are located at:
Redvale, Albany
Whitford, Auckland
Hampton Downs, Waikato Region – opened 2005,
Kate Valley, Canterbury
Green Island, Dunedin

See also
Environment of New Zealand
Litter in New Zealand
Waste management

References

Further reading

External links
Waste page at the Ministry for the Environment
WasteMINZ - Waste Management Institute New Zealand